Robert Ho (23 November 1921 – 16 January 1972) was a Singaporean sailor. He competed in the Dragon event at the 1956 Summer Olympics.

References

External links
 

1921 births
1972 deaths
Singaporean male sailors (sport)
Olympic sailors of Singapore
Sailors at the 1956 Summer Olympics – Dragon
Place of birth missing
20th-century Singaporean people